Martin Joseph O'Malley (born 22 February 1939) is a Canadian journalist and writer. He has written for CBC News and The Globe and Mail.  O'Malley is perhaps best known for a Globe and Mail column in which he coined the line about laws that criminalized homosexual behavior
that Canadian Prime Minister Pierre Trudeau later made famous: "There's no place for the state in the bedrooms of the nation."

O'Malley was born and raised in Winnipeg, Manitoba, moving to Toronto to pursue his career as a newspaper reporter and columnist.

He has written the following books:
 The Past and Future Land: an account of the Mackenzie Valley Pipeline Inquiry
 Doctors
 Hospital
 Gross Misconduct: The Life of Spinner Spencer
 Running Risks
 Game Day: the Blue Jays at SkyDome
 More than Meets the Eye: Watching television watching us

Gross Misconduct earned O'Malley the Author of the Year award in 1989 from the Foundation for the Advancement of Canadian Letters. The book was made into a TV film, directed by Atom Egoyan. O'Malley also wrote the CBC docudrama Giant Mine.

References

External links
Martin O'Malley, CBC Viewpoint

Canadian male journalists
Canadian male non-fiction writers
Canadian non-fiction writers
Canadian people of Irish descent
Journalists from Manitoba
Writers from Winnipeg
1939 births
Living people